ISFiC, or "Illinois Science Fiction in Chicago", is a non-profit organization best known for running the Windycon science fiction convention.

ISFiC was formed in 1973 as a coalition of the various science fiction clubs in Chicago, Illinois, United States.  In addition to being the parent organization for an annual convention, it would also serve as a clearing house for fan activities in Illinois.  The founders of the organization included Larry Propp, Mark and Lynne Aronson, Ann Cass, Jon and Joni Stopa and Mike and Carol Resnick.

Each summer, ISFiC holds a small picnic, named Picnicon after the generally accepted science fiction naming conventions.

ISFiC Press

In 2004, ISFiC started up a small press, ISFiC Press.  Their first book was Robert J. Sawyer's Relativity.  It was released on November 12, 2004, and included an introduction by Mike Resnick, an afterword by Valerie Broege and a cover by Jael. They have published additional books annually, with works winning the Aurora Award and being nominated for the Hugo Award.

ISFiC Writers Contest
In addition to sponsoring Windycon, ISFiC also sponsors an annual writing contest for new authors.  The first winner of the ISFiC Writers Contest was Richard Chwedyk in 1986.  Chwedyk would go on to win the Nebula Award.

The winners of the ISFiC Writers Contest include

1986: Richard Chwedyk, "Getting Along with Larga"
1987: Eugenia M. Hayden, "The Library"
1988: Richard Chwedyk, "A Man Makes a Machine"
1989: No winner
1990: Robin Leigh Michaels, "Ailin’s Castle"
1991: Vanessa Crouther, "Soul to Take"
1992: Sheila Insley, "Make-Up Magic"
1993: C.T. Fluhr, "Dead Chute"
1994: Emmett Gard Pittman, "Packers"
1995: William McMahon, "In Memoriam"
1996: C.T. Fluhr, "All Through the House"
1997: David W. Crawford & Carol Johnson, "Little Girl Lost"
1998: Susan L. Wachowski, "Grandpa"
1999: Sharon L. Nelson, "Passing Through"
2000: No winner
2001: No winner
2002: No winner
2003: John D. Nikitow, "True Worth"
2004: Chris Krolczyk, "Orbital One"
2005: No winner
2006: Francisco Ruiz, "Ad Alienos"
2007: Joe McCauley, "Ivan and the Plate of Fried Chicken"
2008: No winner
2009: John M. Cowan, "Oracle"
2010: Mary Mascari, "Lost and Found"
2011: Mary Mascari, "The Pod"
2012: No award
2013: Liz A. Vogel, "Windy Van Hooten’s Was Never Like This"
2014: Siobhan Duffey, "Under the Hill"
2015: M. Aruguete, "Catamount"
2016: Siobhan Duffy, "The Furrier"
2017: No award
2018: No award
2019: John M. Cowan, "Dead Man Stalking"

References

External links
ISFiC
ISFiC Press

Organizations established in 1973
Science fiction organizations
Organizations based in Chicago